Mohamed Al-Saadi (born 1 January 1968) is a Yemeni long-distance runner who competed internationally for Yemen at the 1996 Summer Olympics.

Career
Al-Saadi competed in the marathon at the 1996 Summer Olympics held in Atlanta, United States, in the marathon there were 124 starting athletes, and Al-Saadi recorded a time of 2 hours 40 minutes to finish in 101st position.

References

External links
 

1968 births
Living people
Yemeni male long-distance runners
Olympic athletes of Yemen
Athletes (track and field) at the 1996 Summer Olympics
20th-century Yemeni people